The Geissflue is a hill of the eastern Jura Mountains, located between the Swiss cantons of Basel-Landschaft and Solothurn. The border with the canton of Aargau runs east of the summit on the Geissfluegrat.

The Geissflue has an elevation of 962 metres above sea level. It is the easternmost summit above 900 metres in the Jura Mountains.

References

External links
Geissflue on Hikr

Mountains of Switzerland
Mountains of the Jura
Mountains of Basel-Landschaft
Mountains of the canton of Solothurn
Mountains of Switzerland under 1000 metres
Basel-Landschaft–Solothurn border